Wilfrid de Fonvielle (1824–1914) was a French science writer and balloonist.

He published hundreds of articles for technical and scientific journals such as L'Aérophile, La Nature, la Revue Scientifique, La Science illustrée, and L'électricité. He was editor of L'Aérophile.

In 1858 he spent two days in a balloon, and in 1869 he traveled 90 km with Gaston Tissandier in 35 minutes. During the siege of Paris in the Franco-Prussian War, he escaped from the city in a balloon and went to London.

His brothers, Arthur (1830–1914) and Ulrich (1833–1911), were political journalists.

References

External links
 

1824 births
1914 deaths
History of aviation
French balloonists
19th-century French journalists
French male writers
French male journalists
French science writers